JSC Komiinteravia was an airline based in Syktyvkar, Komi Republic, Russia. It operated scheduled domestic passenger services, as well as passenger and cargo charter flights to domestic and international destinations. Its main base was Syktyvkar Airport.

Parent company UTair Aviation reorganised Komiinteravia into a new airline UTair Express, which received a certificate in commercial air transport operations on Antonov An-24 aircraft in December 2006.

History 
The airline was established in March 1996 and started operations in July 1997. In 2004 UTair gained control of more than 70% of Komiinteravia (carried 200,000 passengers in 2003).

UTair is planning to set up a new regional division using its subsidiary Komiinteravia that will operate as UTair Express using Antonov An-24 and ATR 42-300 aircraft. It is planning to replace its Komiinteravia's Antonov An-24 fleet with additional ATR 42-300s over the next few years.

The airline's IATA code has since been adopted by Jet4You.

Destinations 
Komiinteravia operated the following services (as of January 2005):
Domestic scheduled destinations: Syktyvkar, Ukhta, Usinsk and Vorkuta.

Fleet 
As of March 2007 the Komiinteravia fleet included:

5 Antonov An-24RV

Previously operated 
As of January 2005 the airline also operated:
4 Tupolev Tu-134A
1 Tupolev Tu-134B
1 Yakovlev Yak-40

References

External links

Komiinteravia (Archive)  (2002-2008)
Komiinteravia (Archive)  (2000-2003)

Defunct airlines of Russia
Airlines established in 1996
Airlines disestablished in 2006
Companies based in Syktyvkar